Ryan Cochrane may refer to:
Ryan Cochrane (soccer) (born 1983), American soccer player
Ryan Cochrane (canoeist) (born 1983), Canadian canoeist
Ryan Cochrane (swimmer) (born 1988), Canadian swimmer